Paico may refers to,

 Pai and Company, an Indian comic book publisher
 Paico (plant) (Dysphania ambrosioides) epazote